A furnace is a structure in which heat is produced with the help of combustion.

Furnace may also refer to:

Appliances

Buildings
 Furnace (central heating): a furnace , or a heater or boiler , used to generate heat for buildings
 Boiler, used to heat water; also called a furnace in American English when used for heating and hot water in a building
 Jetstream furnace or Tempest boiler, a design of wood-fired water heater

Industry
 Industrial furnace, a device used in industrial applications
 Glass melting furnace
 Muffle furnace or retort furnace
 Solar furnace
 Vacuum furnace
 Metallurgical furnace, a device used to heat metal and metal ore
 Basic oxygen furnace
 Bessemer converter
 Blast furnace
Bloomery
 Electric arc furnace
 Electric induction furnace
 Open hearth furnace
 Puddling furnace
 Reverberatory furnace

Places

United Kingdom
 Furnace, Argyll, a village in Scotland
 Furnace, Carmarthenshire, a village in Carmarthenshire, Wales
 Furnace, Ceredigion, a village in Ceredigion, Wales

United States
 Furnace, California, a former settlement
 Furnace, Indiana, a small town
 Furnace, Kentucky
 Furnace, Virginia
 Furnace, West Virginia
 Dover Furnace station, New York
 Furnace Creek, California, a town in Death Valley, California

Arts, entertainment, and media

Films
 Furnace (film), a 2006 horror film
 The Furnace (1920 film), a film based on the novel The Furnace by "Pan"
 The Furnace (2020 film), an Australian adventure drama film

Literature
 Furnace: Lockdown, series of books by author Alexander Gordon Smith
 The Furnace (magazine), a literary magazine
 The Furnace, a 1907 novel by Rose Macaulay

Music
 Furnace (Download album), 1995 album  by the industrial music group Download
 Furnace (Keith Hudson album), 1972
 Furnaces (2016), album by Ed Harcourt

Other uses
 , four ships of the Royal Navy
 Walt Furnace (born 1943), American businessman and politician

See also
 
 Fire test
 Foundry
 Furness (disambiguation)
 Oil refinery
 Oven
 Smelter